Hrušovo is a village and municipality in the Rimavská Sobota District of the Banská Bystrica Region of southern Slovakia. In the village are preserved typical 19th-century houses. Furthermore, in Hrušovo is foodstuff store, post, public library.

History
In historical records, the village was first mentioned in 1297 (1297 Huruswa, 1427 Hrwswa, 1511 Rwsowa). After, it passed to Muráň town. Locals had been engaged in weaving and basketry.

Genealogical resources

The records for genealogical research are available at the state archive "Statny Archiv in Banska Bystrica, Slovakia"

 Lutheran church records (births/marriages/deaths): 1787-1852 (parish A)

See also
 List of municipalities and towns in Slovakia

References

External links
http://www.tourist-channel.sk/hrusovo/indexen.php3
http://www.e-obce.sk/obec/hrusovo/hrusovo.html
Surnames of living people in Hrusovo

Villages and municipalities in Rimavská Sobota District